KMRZ may refer to:

 KMRZ-FM, a radio station (106.7 FM) licensed to serve Superior, Wyoming, United States
 KMRZ-LD, a low-power television station (channel 26, virtual 16) licensed to serve Pomona, California, United States